The Sagem myX-7 is a cellphone manufactured by Sagem Communications. It features a 128x160 pixels TFT LCD Screen with 65,536 colors, a VGA CCD sensor camera, Java MIDP 2.0 with downloadable content, organizer, among others.

Features
 TFT display with 128x160 pixels and 65,536 colors
 VGA video-capable camera
 Java MIDP 2.0
 Exchangeable face plates
 Video record with sound
 Tri Band 900, 1800, 1900 MHz
 WAP access CSD and GPRS
 Weight 106g
 Size 110 x 46 x 22 mm
 SMS and MMS Capability
 Polyphonic ringtones (16 chords) with WAVE files capability
 3.79 V. battery
 Infrared connection
 Two included games: Gulo's Tale and Siberian Strike
 4.3 MB of flash memory

See also
Sagem
Sagem myX-2
Sagem myX-7

Safran mobile phones